Melaleuca Remand and Reintegration Facility is a maximum security prison for women, in Canning Vale, Western Australia. It opened in December 2016, and has a capacity of 254 inmates. Melaleuca is a standalone facility, built on what were previously Units 11 and 12 of Hakea Prison.

The prison is operated by the private company Sodexo. The state government will pay Sodexo a bonus for reducing recidivism for each inmate who stays out of jail for two years. This incentive scheme is the first of its type in Australia.

The prison is named after the Melaleuca plant.

References

External links
 Melaleuca Remand and Reintegration Facility, Department of Corrective Services web page

2016 establishments in Australia
Maximum security prisons in Australia
Prisons in Western Australia
Women's prisons in Australia
Canning Vale, Western Australia